This is a list of botanical gardens in Egypt.

References 

Egypt
Botanical gardens